The Scottish Liberal Party, the section of the Liberal Party in Scotland, was the dominant political party of Victorian Scotland, and although its importance declined with the rise of the Labour and Unionist parties during the 20th century, it was still a significant, albeit much reduced force when it finally merged with the Social Democratic Party in Scotland, to form the Scottish Liberal Democrats in 1988.

The party lost its last remaining seats in the UK Parliament in 1945, and continued to decline in popular support in the post war years, with Jo Grimond (who won back Orkney and Shetland in 1950) being the sole Scottish Liberal MP in the House of Commons from 1951 to 1964. The party gained a partial revival in the 1964 general election returning three further MPs; George Mackie, Russell Johnston and Alasdair Mackenzie. A further gain came the following year with David Steel's victory at the Roxburgh, Selkirk and Peebles by-election. Steel went on to become a pivotal figure in the development of Scottish devolution, in partnership with John Smith, Donald Dewar and other key Labour and Liberal figures.

Victorian party
The Victorian Liberal party in Scotland was not always ideologically unified, and was faced with many internal divisions, particularly amongst the more conservative Whiggish elements of the party who were largely based in Edinburgh and the East, and the more western and Glasgow-based radical Liberals.

The East and North of Scotland Liberal Association and the West and South West of Scotland Liberal Association were founded in 1877.  Early in 1881, they merged, forming the Scottish Liberal Association, led by Gladstone and Adam.  A National Liberal Federation of Scotland was founded in April 1886, but merged into the Liberal Association in December.

The Scottish Women's Liberal Federation was formed in 1891 from regional groups and was led by Anne Lindsay.

Leadership

Chairmen
1886: Victor Bruce
1894: Thomas Gibson-Carmichael
1902: Edward Marjoribanks
1906: John William Crombie
1908: Eugene Wason
1909: George Green
1910: Eugene Wason
1912: William Robertson
1921: Donald Maclean
1925: John Anthony
1933: William Baird
1936: Archibald Sinclair
1936: Philip Kerr
1946: Louise Glen-Coats
1948: Leonard T. M. Gray

1952: Louise Glen-Coats
1953: John Gray Wilson
1954: Charles Hampton Johnston
1956: John Bannerman
1965: George Mackie
1970: Russell Johnston
1973: Robert L. Smith
1975: Menzies Campbell
1977: Terry Grieve
1980: Fred McDermid
1982: Ross Finnie
1986: John Lawrie
1987: Christopher Mason

Presidents
1880s: John Dalrymple
1884: Alexander Duff
1886: Archibald Primrose
1901: Henry Campbell-Bannerman
1909: H. H. Asquith
1928: John Hamilton-Gordon
1934: Ramsay Muir
1935: Archibald Sinclair
1960: Archibald Sinclair and Andrew Murray
1961: Archibald Sinclair
1963: Archibald Sinclair and John Bannerman
1965: John Bannerman
1969: Ray Bannerman
1976: Robert L. Smith
1982: Fred McDermid
1983: George Mackie

Leader
Until 1973, the party was led by the president.
Russell Johnston, 1973–1988

Electoral performance

This chart shows the electoral results of the Scottish Liberal Party, from its first election in 1859, to its last in 1983. Total number of seats, and vote percentage, is for Scotland only.

References

Further reading

External links
 Scottish Liberal Club and Scottish Liberal Party archives, held at the National Library of Scotland

 
19th century in Scotland
20th century in Scotland
Political parties disestablished in 1988
1859 establishments in Scotland
Political parties established in 1859
Defunct political parties in Scotland
1988 disestablishments in the United Kingdom